The Bull Fire was a wildfire that scorched  of land in Kern County, California. The fire, which started on July 26, was the largest wildfire of the 2010 California wildfire season, as well as one of the most destructive with 16 structures being destroyed. As the fire progressed it burned in mainly grass and brush on both sides of the Kern River.

As the fire approached the cities of Riverkern and Kernville it forced the evacuations of hundreds of residents as well as Camp Erwin Owen, a juvenile detention camp.

It became evident early on that the fire had been caused by humans and investigators sealed off the origin of the fire as a crime scene.

References 

2010 California wildfires
Sequoia National Forest
Wildfires in Kern County, California